The Football Association Youth Challenge Cup is an English football competition run by The Football Association for under-18 sides. Only those players between the age of 15 and 18 on 31 August of the current season are eligible to take part. It is dominated by the youth sides of professional teams, mostly from the Premier League, but attracts over 400 entrants from throughout the country.

At the end of the Second World War the FA organised a Youth Championship for County Associations considering it the best way to stimulate the game among those youngsters not yet old enough to play senior football. The matches did not attract large crowds but outstanding players were selected for Youth Internationals and thousands were given the chance to play in a national contest for the first time. In 1951 it was realised that a competition for clubs would probably have a wider appeal. The FA Youth Challenge Cup (1952–53 season) was restricted to the youth teams of clubs, both professional and amateur, who were members of the FA.

The notion of a youth cup was thought of by Sir Joe Richards, the late President of the Football League. He initially put forward the idea to the league clubs but they were not enthused; Richards then took the idea to the Football Association, who liked the idea and created the competition in the same year. The Youth Cup trophy itself was purchased by the Football League during World War II. However, they never found a use for it. Football League secretary Fred Howarth found the trophy in a cupboard at the Starkie Street office and handed it over to the Football Association.

Manchester United are the competition's most successful club, winning it eleven times. They are also the current holders after beating Nottingham Forest 3–1 in the 2022 final.

The tournament has served as a springboard into the professional game for many top British players. The likes of George Best, John Barnes, Ryan Giggs, David Beckham, Gary Neville, Frank Lampard, Michael Owen, Steven Gerrard, Jamie Carragher, Joe Cole, Wayne Rooney, Theo Walcott, Daniel Sturridge, Jack Wilshere, and Gareth Bale had all won the tournament or played in the final. The 1991–92 FA Youth Cup famously spawned the rise of Fergie's Fledglings.

Finals

Winners table

Attendance record
The highest attendance at an FA Youth Cup match was 67,492 for the Manchester United vs Nottingham Forest  final at Old Trafford on 11 May 2022, which Manchester United won 3–1.

International capped winners
Tables are ordered by date of first cap.

1950s

1960s

1970s

1980s

1990s

2000s

2010s

See also
FA Youth Cup Finals
FA Cup
U21 Premier League Cup
Professional Development League
Football League Youth Alliance

References

External links
The FA Youth Cup at The Football Association official website

 
Recurring sporting events established in 1952
1
1952 establishments in England